Abdelmohsen Shahrayen (born 15 September 1976), also known as Abdulmuhsen Ali or Abdul Muhsen Ali, is a Kuwaiti fencer. He competed in the individual foil events at the 1996 and 2000 Summer Olympics.

References

External links

1976 births
Living people
Kuwaiti male foil fencers
Olympic fencers of Kuwait
Fencers at the 1996 Summer Olympics
Fencers at the 2000 Summer Olympics
Fencers at the 1994 Asian Games
Fencers at the 1998 Asian Games
Fencers at the 2002 Asian Games
Asian Games competitors for Kuwait